Derrick Oden (born September 29, 1970) is a former American football linebacker who played three seasons with the Philadelphia Eagles of the National Football League (NFL). He was drafted by the Philadelphia Eagles in the sixth round of the 1993 NFL Draft. He played college football at the University of Alabama and attended Hillcrest High School in Tuscaloosa, Alabama.

References

External links
Just Sports Stats
Fanbase profile

Living people
1970 births
Players of American football from Los Angeles
American football linebackers
Alabama Crimson Tide football players
Philadelphia Eagles players